Mary MacGregor is the singer's self-titled third and final album, released in 1980. After recording two albums for Ariola Records - who had also released a Mary MacGregor compilation - MacGregor had recorded the track "Good Friend" for the 1979 film Meatballs whose soundtrack album was released by RSO Records. "Good Friend" had been sufficiently successful - reaching No. 39 on the Billboard Hot 100 - for RSO to sign MacGregor in December 1979. This resultant self-titled album produced a minor hit in "Dancin' Like Lovers" - No. 72 in the spring of 1980 - followed by the non-charting "Somebody Please" which was evidently MacGregor's final single release. The Mary MacGregor album is out of print and has been issued on CD.

Track listing 
Side One:
 "Dancin' Like Lovers" (Larry Herbstritt, Douglas Thiele)
 "You're Just Between Love"
 "Somebody Please" (R. Prentice)
 "Love, What Took You So Long" (Richard Kerr, John Bettis)
 "Anything But Yes Is Still a No" (Leslie Pearl)
Side Two:
 "Good Friend" (Elmer Bernstein, Norman Gimbel)
 "Randy"
 "I Can't Hold On" (Karla Bonoff)
 "Dominoes"
 "Never Give Up"

Personnel
James House, Michael Landau, Ronald Cook, Steve Lukather, Larry Guzy - guitar
Marc Boeddeker, Mike Porcaro, Neil Stubenhaus - bass
Brian Whitcomb, Jai Winding, Pete Robinson - keyboards
David J. Holman - synthesizer, percussion
Mike Botts - drums
Bryan Savage - flute
Virgil Beckham - backing vocals on "Anything But Yes Is Still a No" and "Never Give Up"
David Blumberg - arranger, conductor

Mary MacGregor albums
1980 albums
RSO Records albums